Elsa Stralia, born Elsie Mary Fischer (1 March 1881 – 31 August 1945) was an Australian soprano with an international reputation in Europe and America.

Family
The daughter of Johannes Hugo Fischer (1850-1901), and Annie Christiana Fischer (1858-1898), née Claussen, Elsie Mary Fischer was born in Norwood, South Australia on 1 March 1881. The family moved to Melbourne in 1899, where she was convent-educated.

She married William Mountford Moses (1875-1940) in Sydney on 24 December 1908. She divorced Moses in 1935.

She married Adolph Theodor Christensen (1878-1942) of Patea, New Zealand in Sydney on 14 November 1935. They lived in Patea until Christensen's death in 1942.

Stage name
Like other noted Australian sopranos, such as  June Mary Gough (1929-2005) ("June Bronhill", after Broken Hill), Vera Honor Hempseed (1890-1952) ("Madame Vera Tasma", after Tasmania), Helen Porter Mitchell (1861-1931) ("Nellie Melba", after Melbourne), Dorothy Mabel Thomas (1896-1978) ("Dorothy Canberra"), Florence Ellen Towl (1870-1952) ("Madame Ballara", after Ballarat), and Florence Mary Wilson (1892-1968) ("Florence Austral"), Elsie Mary Fischer adopted the stage name "Elsa Stralia" in honour of Australia.

Career
After appearing in Sydney, she studied in Milan and London. She made her Covent Garden, London debut as Donna Elvira in Mozart's Don Giovanni in 1913, under the professional name of Elsa Stralia. She appeared at Covent Garden, and in Milan, Paris, South Africa and New York City. She toured in South Africa, and in a number of American cities, once singing "The Star-Spangled Banner" while dressed as the Statue of Liberty. She recorded for the Columbia Graphophone Company, and toured Australasia in 1925 and 1934.

Death
On the death of her husband, she returned to Australia. She died, childless, at Belgrave, Victoria.

The Elsa Stralia Scholarship
Her estate was used to establish a scholarship for young Australian female singers.

Footnotes

References
 The Australian Dictionary of Biography, Volume 12, 1891-1931, edited by John Ritchie (1990, Melbourne University Press)
 Madame Stralia, The Windsor and Richmond Gazette, (Friday, 19 June 1914), p.10.

1881 births
1945 deaths
Australian operatic sopranos
People from Adelaide
Singers from Melbourne
20th-century Australian women opera singers